The Creech is an American three issue Sci-Fi/Horror comic book series published by Image Comics in 1997, followed by a subsequent three issue series in 2001. The series was created by Greg Capullo.

The title character is an in vitro created life form that was made from hundreds of aborted fetuses by Dr. Pashu Battu, an engineer at The Agency. When Battu realizes The Agency intends to exploit The Creech as  force for destruction, he sabotages the project and the creature is let loose on the city.

In 1998 the Creech character appeared in a line of Spawn action figures.

References

External links
 The Creech

1997 comics debuts
Action figures
Characters created by Greg Capullo
Image Comics titles
Fictional genetically engineered characters
Fictional monsters